Benjamin Aaron Roderick (May 11, 1899 – November 30, 1974) was a professional American football player during the early years of the National Football League (NFL) with the Buffalo All-Americans, Canton Bulldogs and Buffalo Bisons. Roderick won an NFL championship with the Canton Bulldogs in 1923. He also played for Cleveland Tigers, while playing in the American Professional Football Association, the organization that later became the NFL.

College football
In 1922, Roderick transferred from Columbia University to Boston College. His teammate at Columbia, Sam Dana, who became the longest surviving NFL alumnus in 2003, referred to Roderick as "a sweetheart of a player". Dana later adopted Roderick's style of running.

Korean War
Roderick was one of 226 NFL personnel who served in the military during the Korean War.

Head coaching record

References

1899 births
Year of death missing
Boston College Eagles football players
Buffalo Bisons (NFL) players
Buffalo All-Americans players
Canton Bulldogs players
Cleveland Tigers (NFL) players
Columbia Lions football players
College of Wooster alumni
Ohio Northern Polar Bears football coaches
American military personnel of the Korean War
People from Navarre, Ohio
Players of American football from Ohio